The 2000 Amarnath pilgrimage attack on 1-2 August was the massacre of at least 89 people (official count) to 105 (as reported by PTI) and injury to at least 62 people, in at least five different coordinated attacks by Islamist militants in Anantnag district and Doda district of Indian administered Kashmir.

Out of these, 32 were killed on 2 August in 2000 in a massacre at Nunwan base camp in Pahalgam. The dead included 21 Hindu pilgrims, 7 local Muslim shopkeepers and 3 security officers. 7 other people were also injured.

Details
A total of up to 105 or more were killed and at least 62 were injured in five separate coordinated terror attacks, including the following partial count on the morning of 3 August 2000.

 At least 32 people and 60 more injured, who were mostly unarmed civilians persons. 21 were Hindu pilgrims, seven Muslims shopkeepers and porters, and 3 security officials. The pilgrims were on their way to Amarnath cave shrine on annual pilgrimage. Many of those killed were local Bakarwal gurjar Muslim men and porters hiring their horses and services to ferry the pilgrims to the site. Subsequently, then Prime Minister of India Atal Bihari Vajpayee visited Pahalgam and blamed Lashkar-e-Taiba for the killings.
 At least 27 civilian migrant labourers from the states of Uttar Pradesh, Bihar and Madhya Pradesh, were killed in similar simultaneous terror attacks in Mirbazar-Qazigund and Sandoo-Acchabal in Anantnag district.
 At least 11 unarmed civilian people were killed in a pre-dawn terrorist attack in a remote village in Doda district.
 At least 7 unarmed civilian were killed when around the same time as Doda attack, another group of terrorists simultaneously attacked another remote village in Kupwara to seven Muslim members of a family of a surrendered former militant.
 At least 8 unarmed civilian were killed and 2 more injured in an ambush by terrorists on a group of Village Defence Committee patrol party members of Kayar village of Doda district.

Aftermath
Then Prime Minister of India, Atal Bihari Vajpayee blamed Pakistan for being determined to sabotage democracy in Jammu and Kashmir.

See also
 Kanwar Yatra
 2017 Amarnath Yatra attack
 2003 Nadimarg massacre
 Amarnath land transfer controversy
 Islamic terrorism
 List of massacres in India
 List of terrorist incidents in India
 List of Islamist terrorist attacks

References

Further reading

External links 
 
 Amarnath: Journey to the shrine of a Hindu god, Boston Globe news story in pictures, 13 July 2012.

20th-century mass murder in India
Islamic terrorism in India
Massacres in 2000
Massacres in Jammu and Kashmir
2000s in Jammu and Kashmir
Violence against Hindus in India
2000 in India
Terrorist incidents in India in 2000
Massacres in India
August 2000 events in Asia